Deep in 2 The Cut is the debut studio album of Final Cut, released in 1989 by Full Effect Records.

Reception

Track listing

Personnel
Adapted from the Deep in 2 The Cut liner notes.

Final Cut
 Jeff Mills – instruments, production
 Anthony Srock – instruments

Production and design
 Mike Banks (as Mad Mike Banks) – production

Release history

References

External links 
 

1989 debut albums
Final Cut (band) albums